Montmeló is a municipality in the comarca of Vallès Oriental, within the Barcelona metropolitan area, in Catalonia, Spain. It contains the Circuit de Barcelona-Catalunya, which is the home of the Formula One Spanish Grand Prix and the MotoGP Catalan Grand Prix.

Demography

References

 Panareda Clopés, Josep Maria; Rios Calvet, Jaume; Rabella Vives, Josep Maria (1989). Guia de Catalunya, Barcelona: Caixa de Catalunya.

External links 

Official website 
 Government data pages